Nettleton is an unincorporated community in Caldwell County, in the U.S. state of Missouri.

History
A post office called Nettleton was established in 1872, and remained in operation until 1980. The community was named after George H. Nettleton, a railroad man.

References

Unincorporated communities in Caldwell County, Missouri
1872 establishments in Missouri
Unincorporated communities in Missouri